Howard Joseph "Howie" Auer (January 9, 1908 – November 12, 1985) was an American football player. He played for the Michigan Wolverines football teams from 1929–1931 and for the Philadelphia Eagles of the NFL in 1933.

Auer was born in Detroit, Michigan in 1908 and attended high school in Bay City, Michigan. He enrolled at the University of Michigan in 1928 and played football for Harry Kipke in his first three seasons as the Wolverines head football coach.  As a sophomore in 1929, Auer was the starting tackle in seven of nine games played by the Wolverines.  In 1930, injuries limited Auer to four games as a starter on the undefeated (8–0–1) 1930 Michigan team that tied for the Big Ten Conference championship.  As a senior in 1931, he was a starting tackle in eight of Michigan's nine games and was part of another Big Ten co-championship team.  At the end of the 1931 season, sports writer Hank Casserly picked Auer as a first-team player on his All-Big Ten team and explained the selection of Auer as follows:"Auer of Michigan, a greatly underrated tackle, gets the other post on the first team. He was a consistent performer during every game and stole the show from his other rivals during the closing games of the season.  Even in the Ohio State game, in which Michigan was outplayed, Auer stood out. He was a powerhouse on both offense and defense, and blocked tackles, ends, and guards, with equal ease and was one of the reasons why the Wolverines had the greatest all around line in the Western conference."
Auer was also selected as a second-team All-Big Ten player by the United Press in 1932.

After graduating from Michigan, Auer played one season of professional football for the Philadelphia Eagles.  Auer lived in Valrico, Florida in his later years.  He died in 1985 at age 77.

References

1908 births
1985 deaths
Michigan Wolverines football players
Sportspeople from Bay City, Michigan
People from Valrico, Florida
American football tackles
Philadelphia Eagles players